Florence Marian McNeill,  (26 March 1885 – 22 February 1973) was a Scottish folklorist, author, editor, suffragist and political activist. She is best known for writing The Silver Bough (not to be confused with The Golden Bough), a four-volume study of Scottish folklore; also The Scots Kitchen and Scots Cellar: Its Traditions and Lore with Old-time Recipes.

Biography 
McNeill was born in Holm, Orkney on 26 March 1885 to Jessie Janet Dewar and the Reverend Daniel McNeill, a minister of the Free Kirk in Orkney. Dewar was originally from Fochabers, and Rev. McNeill was from Argyll, and was minister of Holm for nearly fifty years. Marian was the eighth of twelve children, and was nicknamed "Floss" by her family and friends. Her sister Mary Lauchline McNeill became a doctor, and a suffragist and served in the World War One Scottish Women's Hospital.

She was educated at Kirkwall Burgh School, where she was friends with poet Edwin Muir.

In 1912 she graduated from the University of Glasgow with an MA. For the next year, she taught English in France and Germany.

She returned to the UK in 1913 and worked initially as an organiser for the Scottish Federation of Women's Suffrage Societies, and later as secretary for the Association for Moral and Social Hygiene in London where she remained until 1917. At the end of the World War I, she lived in Greece for a while. After that, she moved back to Edinburgh and started work as a researcher for the Scottish National Dictionary, and by 1929 she had become principal assistant on the project.

In the years between the First and Second World Wars she became involved in the revival of Scottish literature and culture known as the Scottish Renaissance. She is well known as the author of The Scots Kitchen, published in 1929. This encyclopaedic work covers the essentials and diversity of Scotland's culinary heritage, including many historical and literary references. Recipes include Forfar bridies, Cock-a-leekie soup and porridge.

She was one of the founder members of the Scottish National Party, along with her brother Duncan MacNeill, and later became its vice president.

A smaller work, equally well researched is her Iona: A History of the Island. Noting the "much detail" which characterised works on the subject already in existence in 1920, a "modest handbook" was nowhere to be found; a deficiency she set about rectifying.

In 1932, she wrote her only novel, The Road Home.

From 1957 onwards she published a four volume study of Scottish National Festivals, The Silver Bough, echoing Frazer's title The Golden Bough. This treasury of Scottish folklore and folk belief covers both the principal national festivals as well as many local ones and was the result of a lifetime of research. In 2008 British Youth Music Theatre adapted the work for a stage production at the Aberdeen International Youth Festival. Scottish composer Gerard McBurney collaborated with Scottish poet Iain Finlay Macleod, director Kath Burlinson and choreographer Struan Leslie on the adaptation.

In 1962 McNeill was awarded an MBE for services to Scottish culture. She died in Edinburgh on 22 February 1973.

Bibliography
 McNeill, F. Marian (1957–1968). The Silver Bough: a Four Volume Study of the National and Local Festivals of Scotland, Vol. 1–4. William MacLellan, Glasgow. Paperback edition, 
 Volume I Scottish Folk-Lore and Folk-Belief
 Volume II A Calendar of Scottish National Festivals, Candlemas to Harvest Home
 Volume III A Calendar of Scottish National Festivals, Halloween to Yule
 Volume IV the Local Festivals of Scotland
 Iona: A History of the Island. Hardback Blackie & Son. 1st Edition 1920, 2nd Edition 1935, 3rd Edition 1946, Later updates 
 With F J Wakefield  An Inquiry in Ten Towns in England and Wales into the Protection of Minor Girls (1916)
 The Road Home (1932)

Cookery books
   (2004)
 The Book of Breakfasts (1932)
 Recommended Recipes (1948)
 The Scots Cellar, Its Traditions and Lore (1956)
 Recipes from Scotland (1946)

References

External links
 F McNeill on About Orkney
 Saltire society page 

1885 births
1973 deaths
Scottish folklorists
Scottish Renaissance
People from Orkney
Scottish novelists
Edwardian era
19th-century Scottish people
20th-century British writers
20th-century British women writers
20th-century Scottish writers
20th-century Scottish women writers
Women food writers
Members of the Order of the British Empire
Alumni of the University of Glasgow
Scottish women activists
Scottish activists
Scottish suffragettes
Scottish National Party politicians
Scottish nationalists
Women folklorists